Kenneth Darnell Davidson (born August 17, 1967) is a former American football defensive end. He played professionally in the National Football League (NFL) for the Pittsburgh Steelers (1990–1993), the Houston Oilers (1994–1995), and the Cincinnati Bengals (1996). He attended Louisiana State University, where he played college football for the LSU Tigers football team.

References

1967 births
Living people
American football defensive ends
Cincinnati Bengals players
Houston Oilers players
LSU Tigers football players
Pittsburgh Steelers players
Players of American football from Shreveport, Louisiana